The Wellington District was a historic district in Upper Canada and its successor, Canada West, which existed until 1849. It was formed in June 1840 from townships transferred from certain other districts:

For electoral purposes, it was called Waterloo County and the district town was Guelph.

Upon the passage of the Act of Union 1840, for electoral purposes Erin Township was attached to Halton County, which became known as the East Riding of Halton, and the remaining townships of Wellington that had previously been part of Halton became known as the West Riding of Halton.

When the East and West Ridings were renamed for their respective counties in 1845, the township of Erin continued to be part of Halton for electoral purposes, and the township of Dumfries was similarly included for such purposes in Waterloo. At that time, Waterloo County was declared to consist of the following townships:

 Arthur
 Amaranth
 Bentinck
 Derby
 Eramosa
 Egremont
 Guelph
 Glenelg
 Garafraxa
 Holland
 Luther
 Mornington
 Minto
 Maryborough
 Melancthon
 Normanby
 Nichol
 Peel
 Proton
 Puslinch
 Sydenham
 Sullivan
 Waterloo
 Wilmot
 Woolwich
 Wellesley

In 1849, Wellington District was abolished, and Waterloo County remained for municipal and judicial purposes. The territory of the Bruce Peninsula became part of Waterloo in 1849, but was later withdrawn and transferred to Bruce County in 1851.

Notes

References

Districts of Upper Canada
1838 establishments in Upper Canada
1849 disestablishments in Canada
History of Wellington County, Ontario
History of the Regional Municipality of Waterloo